Sven Gudmar Svenson (September 29, 1919 in Eskilstuna – February 25, 1997 in Uppsala) was a Swedish historian, banker, director and writer.

Sven G. Svenson was CEO of Sparfrämjandet 1951-1961 and 1963-1979 CEO of Svenska Sparbanksföreningen. He was also Vice Chairman of Tryckeri AB Marieberg, member of Royal Swedish Academy of Engineering Sciences from 1974, member of Royal Gustavus Adolphus Academy from 1975, as well as honorary President of Orphei Drängar.

Bibliography 
 1952 – Gattjinatraktaten 1799: studier i Gustaf IV Adolfs utrikespolitik 1796–1800 (thesis in history)
 1967 – Mord och lärda mödor
 1982 – Ulf Peder Olrog i Uppsala: några minnen
 1986 – Gunnar Wennerberg: en biografi
 1989 – Tre porträtt: skalden Nybom, Curry Treffenberg - en moralist, Hugo Alfvén, i kamp mot ålderdomen
 1994 – Erland Hjärne: en historikers livsöde

References 
 Svenson, Sven G. in Vem är det, pp. 1067, 1993

External links 
 Sven G. Svenson in Libris

1997 deaths
1919 births
Members of the Royal Swedish Academy of Engineering Sciences
Swedish non-fiction writers
Burials at Uppsala old cemetery